Syltefjordstauran is a mountain cliff in Båtsfjord Municipality in Troms og Finnmark county, Norway. It is among the largest bird cliffs in Finnmark county.

The cliff hosts the largest colony of black-legged kittiwake in Northern Europe as well as a large colony of northern gannet.

References

Båtsfjord
Seabird colonies
Mountains of Troms og Finnmark